The Invercargill Licensing Trust, (ILT), is a licensing trust in the city of Invercargill in New Zealand. It has a monopoly on the development of premises licensed for the sale of alcoholic beverages, and associated accommodation in the city; and uses the profits from these to fund school, sports and cultural groups, and welfare bodies.

History 
The concept of licensing trusts in New Zealand was first introduced by the Invercargill Licensing Trust Act 1944, and was developed by the recommendations of the Report of the Royal Commission on Licensing 1946. It was not originally directly elected, with three members being appointed by the New Zealand Government, two members being appointed by the Invercargill City Council, and one member appointed by the South Invercargill Borough Council.

Board 
This is the current ILT board. The most recent election was in 2022.

Donations and grants 
In 2015 the ILT provided donations and grants totalling around $4 million to a wide range of organisations. A further $4 million in donations and grants was made by the  ILT Foundation, which owns and operates all the gaming machines in ILT establishments.

Books on the ILT
 History of the Invercargill Licensing Trust (Invercargill, 1955) 
 Clive Lind, Pubs, Pints and People: 50 Years of the Invercargill Licensing Trust, 1994 Invercargill

References

External links 
ILT official website
Unofficial Survey of Invercargill Licensing Trust operations by the People of Invercargill

Organisations based in Invercargill
Alcohol distribution retailers in New Zealand
Community organizations